Penny & The Quarters are a "lost" soul band which came to prominence in 2010 after an unreleased demo of their song "You And Me" was used in the film Blue Valentine. Teenagers at the time, Penny & The Quarters were invited to audition by Harmonic Sounds Studio in Columbus, Ohio, recording three demo songs in all. The group consisted of Jay Robinson, the lead male vocalist and songwriter, and a female lead, Nannie "Penny" Coulter, with several male backup singers and an accompanying guitarist.

The songs were recorded some time between 1970 and 1975 at either Harmonic Sounds Studio or at the home of studio co-owner Clem Price in Columbus. Relegated to storage, the songs were discovered after Price's death in 2006 when a collection of tapes and acetate records were purchased at his estate sale. They were subsequently given to an archival record company, The Numero Group, after a Columbus, Ohio, musicologist named Dante Carfagna came into possession of the recordings.

"You And Me"
One of the songs they recorded, "You And Me" was released by the Numero Group and was later heard by actor Ryan Gosling, who recommended it to the director Derek Cianfrance as the song meant to bring the two lead characters together in Blue Valentine.
 
The Numero Group announced in 2011 that they were actively seeking members of Penny & The Quarters or their surviving relatives in order to share the growing record royalties from "You And Me". Ken Shipley of Numero Group told reporters, "We have played this recording to over 100 movers and shakers from the time and no one has a clue." The members were identified in 2011 as Nannie "Penny" (Coulter) Sharpe and her brothers Preston Coulter, Johnny Coulter and Donald Coulter. Jay Robinson, a singer associated with the siblings, died in 2009.

The song was sampled by Vince Kidd on his single 'You & Me', released June 2013.

The song was used in the "Wonderful Life" Ikea advert campaign in April 2016.

The song is used in  Oreo advertising campaign since the fall of 2017. 

The song was used in the 2023 television series "Will Trent". S1 E4

The song was used the Netflix Original series “Outer Banks” in 2023 S3 E3

The song was covered by Durand Jones & The Indications in 2018

This song is used in LL Bean's advertising campaign starting in November 2021.  

Ginny And Georgia: Season 1, Episode 2.

References

American soul musical groups
Musical groups from Columbus, Ohio